Ashira, is a small village along the Guardafui Channel in the northeastern Bari region of Somalia. It lies within the Bayla District. It lies just south of the Hafun promontory.

References

Populated places in Bari, Somalia